The common pandora (Pagellus erythrinus)  is a fish of the sea bream family, Sparidae. It is a popular food fish in Mediterranean countries, with delicate white flesh.

It has a slim, oval fusiform body, with a smallish mouth and scales covering its face. The eyes are smaller than those of Pagellus bogaraveo and Pagellus acarne. It is silver in colour with a pink tinge, particularly on its back. A typical specimen measures 10–30 cm, but it can reach as much as 50 cm in length.

The common pandora is a hermaphrodite, spending the first two years of its life as a female, and the third year as a male. It is omnivorous, but mainly feeds on smaller fish and benthic invertebrates. As most fishes, the common pandora harbours a variety of parasites; for example, the nematode Philometra filiformis is a parasite of the ovary of this fish.

Distribution
The fish is found along the eastern shores of the Atlantic Ocean, from Scandinavia to Cape Verde, as well as the Mediterranean and the North Sea. In terms of genetic diversity, there appears to be a high level of connectivity from the Atlantic through the Mediterranean.

References

External links
 
 

Pagellus
Fish of the East Atlantic
Fish of the North Sea
Fish of the Mediterranean Sea
Marine fish of Europe
Marine fauna of North Africa
Fish described in 1758
Taxa named by Carl Linnaeus